This article concerns the period 249 BC – 240 BC.

References

Bibliography